X Neural Switcher, or xneur, is a free software (GNU GPL) computer program for automatic (intelligent) keyboard layout changing in the X Window System. It runs on all flavours of Linux and BSD. Currently, it is mainly used to change between Russian and English, but also supports Ukrainian, Belorussian, French, Romanian, Kazakh and German.

The program loads itself into the background and monitors user input. If an entered character sequence is uncommon in the current user input language, then xneur changes the keyboard layout, and rewrites the (possibly incomplete) word in the more appropriate language. For example, the incorrect "Dbrbgtlbz" will be changed into the Russian "Википедия" ("Wikipedia"), and vice versa, "фззду" will become "apple". Here, the transliteration was made between most popular keyboard layouts: English QWERTY and Russian ЙЦУКЕН.

The user can add new words or character sequences into the program's dictionary, and can manually change languages with a keyboard shortcut. Automatic detection can be disabled, leaving only manual switching.

X Neural Switcher is divided into two parts:
 xneur server works as a daemon in a basic X Window System
 graphical frontend gxneur (for GNOME, uses GTK+) and kxneur (for KDE, currently in development)

X Neural Switcher was added to ALT Linux, Russian SuSE club, Debian, some FreeBSD ports and some Russian Ubuntu repositories.

Similar software
  Punto Switcher (Windows, Mac OS X)
  Keyboard Ninja (Windows)
  RuSwitcher (Mac OS X)

References

External links 
 

Keyboard layout software
Free software programmed in C